Daniel Borel (born 14 February 1950) is a Swiss businessman and co-founder of technology firm Logitech.

Education

In 1973, Daniel Borel earned an engineering degree in Physics from the École Polytechnique Fédérale de Lausanne in Switzerland, and in 1977 received a Master of Science degree in Computer Science from Stanford University.

Business

Borel co-founded Logitech at his father-in-law's farm in 1981 with Pierluigi Zappacosta and Giacomo Marini. He served as Logitech's Chairman 1982 to 2008, and served as the company's CEO from 1982 to 1988, and again from 1992 to 1998. In 1988, he took the Logitech Group public on the Swiss stock market, and on the Nasdaq in 1997. He is currently serving on Logitech's board of directors.

Other endeavours

Borel currently serves on the board of directors of Logitech and Nestlé. He also serves on the board of Defitech, a foundation that brings IT technology to disabled people and is chairman of swissUP, a foundation dedicated to the promoting education in Switzerland.

In 2019, Borel participated in a fundraising campaign for Unibuddy, a London-based peer-to-peer EdTech platform founded in 2016 by Kimeshan Naidoo and Diego Fanara. Unibuddy raised a total of $5 million in its Series A investment round. Since then, Borel has continued to invest in further Unibuddy funding rounds and the company has raised $32 million to date including a $20 million Series B round in 2021.

References

1950 births
Living people
People from Neuchâtel
Swiss businesspeople
Stanford University alumni
École Polytechnique Fédérale de Lausanne alumni